Capital punishment is a legal penalty in Zimbabwe. Despite its legality, Zimbabwe has not carried out any executions since 2005. However, the country is classified as "Retentionist" due to a lack of "an established practice or policy against carrying out executions." Zimbabwe abstained during the 2020 United Nations moratorium on the death penalty resolution.

References 

 
Zimbabwe
Law of Zimbabwe